Köklüce, historically Arzıl, is a village in the Araban District, Gaziantep Province, Turkey. The village is inhabited by Turkmens of the Qiziq tribe.

References

Villages in Araban District